Idanha may refer to:

Idanha, Oregon, a city in the United States
Idanha, Portugal, one of several places in Portugal